Rainbow Computing was an Apple II retailer and video game software publisher that was established in 1976 by Gene Sprouse and Glenn Dollar in the San Fernando Valley of Los Angeles, California. The original store was located in Granada Hills but was eventually relocated to Northridge. The company opened a second location in Woodland Hills, where it operated for nine years until the sale of the company to the Torrance-based Pathfinder Computer Centers retail chain in 1985.

Notable employees and customers
 David Gordon (customer)

See also

References

Consumer electronics retailers in the United States
Defunct computer companies based in California
Retail companies based in California
Software companies based in California
Video game retailers of the United States
Technology companies based in Greater Los Angeles
Companies based in Los Angeles
Northridge, Los Angeles
Woodland Hills, Los Angeles
American companies established in 1976
Computer companies established in 1976
Retail companies established in 1976
Video game companies established in 1976
Retail companies disestablished in 1985
Video game companies disestablished in 1985
1976 establishments in California
1985 disestablishments in California
Defunct companies based in Greater Los Angeles